Tiit Kuningas (born 30 October 1949) is an Estonian sports journalist.

He was born in Massiaru, Pärnu County. He studied at Tallinn Pedagogical Institute. In youth he exercised several sport disciplines, including basketball and volleyball.

As a sport journalist, he has contributed to several newspapers, including Spordileht, Postimees, and the magazine Sporditäht.

He has also been a successful quizzer. He was a member of the quiz team which participated on the ETV television program Naapurivisa in the late 1960s.

Publications

 Olümpiamosaiik (1992)
 XXVI suveolümpiamängud (1996, one of the authors)
 Sport XX sajandil (2002, with Tiit Lääne)
 Torino 2006. XX taliolümpiamängud (2006, one of the authors)

References

Living people
1949 births
Estonian journalists
Estonian television personalities
Tallinn University alumni
People from Häädemeeste Parish